Phaeoses argoceros is a moth in the family Tineidae. It was described by Edward Meyrick in 1937. It is found in Singapore.

References

Moths described in 1937
Hieroxestinae